Cristelo is a parish of the municipality of Paredes, Portugal. The population in 2011 was 1,891, in an area of 2.02 km².

References

Freguesias of Paredes, Portugal